The Australian Competition and Consumer Commission (ACCC) is the chief competition regulator of the Government of Australia, located within the Department of the Treasury. It was established in 1995 with the amalgamation of the Australian Trade Practices Commission and the Prices Surveillance Authority to administer the Trade Practices Act 1974, which was renamed the Competition and Consumer Act 2010 on 1 January 2011. The ACCC's mandate is to protect consumer rights and business rights and obligations, to perform industry regulation and price monitoring, and to prevent illegal anti-competitive behaviour.

Historical origins
The ACCC's deeper origins are found in the Restrictive Trade Practices Act of Sir Garfield Barwick, Attorney-General in the Liberal Government of Sir Robert Menzies in 1965. Opponents derided Barwick's Trade Practices Act 1965 as "ineffectual".

 (The Act) did not declare any practices illegal ipso facto, but only did so after detailed investigation by the Trade Practices Commissioner. There were so many restrictive practices reported to the Commissioner, and the investigations were so prolonged, that one cynic remarked that at the (then) current rate of progress, it would take a hundred years to examine them all!

Though recognised as a failure, Barwick's legislation established in Australian law "the principle of legislative coverage of trade practices". The area badly needed reform. Lionel Murphy, the Attorney-General in the Whitlam Labor Government, solicited the advice of the economist and business commentator, Professor Ted Wheelwright. In April 1973, Wheelwright produced a report for Murphy which became the blueprint of new legislation. He recommended, among other things, that the Act be clearly focused on protecting the consumer.

Murphy is acknowledged as having completely changed the previous approach regarding trade practices in Australia. For the first time in Australian federal law, his Trade Practices Bill, which was passed on 6 August 1974, introduced offences related to monopolisation, exclusive dealing, price discrimination, resale price maintenance, restraints of trade by agreement, anti-competitive mergers, misleading advertising, coercive sales conduct, pyramid selling, and the sale of unsolicited goods.

Though the Act included substantial penalties, Murphy's initiative received very little opposition in the Parliament or the business community.

Roles 

The ACCC administers the Competition and Consumer Act, and has standing to take action in the Federal Court of Australia to enforce its provision. The Competition and Consumer Act is a broad range of provisions, such as provisions on anti-competitive conduct, the Australian Consumer Law and regulation of telecommunications and energy industries. The ACCC, under the Act, also regulates certain industries by providing access to national infrastructure. The ACCC also has an educative role and seeks to educate both consumers and businesses as to their rights and responsibilities under the act.

The Australian Energy Regulator is a constituent but separate part of the ACCC and is responsible for economic energy regulation. It shares staff and premises with the ACCC, but has a separate board, although at least one board member must also be a Commissioner at the ACCC.

Restrictive trade practices 

In most cases the spirit of the act, and thus the actions of the ACCC, favours neither consumer nor supplier, but strives to achieve a competitive market without artificial restrictions. For example, refusal to deal – a producer refusing to supply a potential retailer or customer with a product – is not itself illegal unless the action would have an anti-competitive effect on the market as a whole.

Penalties 

One role of the ACCC is to bring court actions against companies that breach the Competition and Consumer Act 2010.

Companies that do not comply with the restrictive trade practices provisions of CCA may be fined by the Federal Court. There are three ways the maximum fine can be calculated. The maximum possible fine is the larger of A$10,000,000; or three times the value of the illegal benefit; or (if the value of the benefit cannot be ascertained) 10% of turnover for the preceding 12 months. Individuals may be fined up to $500,000 and since 2009 certain offences under the Competition and Consumer Act (such as price fixing or participation in a cartel) have been criminalised with executives who engage in conduct which contravenes the relevant provisions liable for a custodial sentence of up to 10 years in prison (44ZZRF and 44ZZRG of the CCA).

Companies that do not comply with the consumer protection provisions of CCA may be fined by the Federal Court, up to $1.1 million for companies and $220,000 for individuals.

The ACCC also has power to accept, on its own behalf, court enforceable undertakings under s87B of the Competition and Consumer Act. Such undertakings may include a wide range of remedies to the conduct.

A range of other remedies can be ordered by the court. For example, companies are frequently forced to publish retractions of false advertising claims in national newspapers and at their places of business. Companies found in breach of the CCA are usually bound to implement a compliance program to ensure future compliance with the Act.

Consumer confidence 

In regard to its role of safeguarding consumer rights, there has been occasional criticism of the ACCC for being "all-talk-no-action". This criticism is most likely due to the inherent difficulty in obtaining sufficient evidence to prove breaches of the restrictive trade practices provisions of the Competition and Consumer Act.

The ACCC has exercised its authority in a number of retail areas, including fining retailer Target for false advertising and Woolworths (including some Safeway-branded supermarkets in Victoria) for anti-competitive liquor deals.

In 2008, the ACCC published findings of its inquiry into the competitiveness of retail prices for groceries in Australia. The report found that the Australian supermarket sector is "workably competitive", but price competition is limited by barriers to entry and a lack of incentive for the two major players, Coles and Woolworths, to compete on price. The report also noted that Coles and Woolworths engage in deliberate strategies designed to ensure they maintain exclusive access to prime sites such as shopping centres to prevent centre managers leasing space to competing supermarkets.

In September 2009, the ACCC reached agreement with Coles and Woolworths to phase out restrictive lease agreements. The ACCC has enforced the law against producers of quack devices with medical claims like Power Balance. It won a case on 24 March 2016 against Valve for failing to provide refunds for faulty products, and making representations that domestic consumer guarantees did not apply to purchases using the Steam client.

Product safety and recalls 
The ACCC maintains a website listing all Australian product recalls and the following organisations are commissioned to assist with the surveillance and monitoring of product safety in relevant areas.

 Food products – Food Standards Australia New Zealand
 Motor vehicles – Department of Infrastructure, Transport, Regional Development and Local Government (Australia)
 Therapeutic goods – Therapeutic Goods Administration
 Agricultural and veterinary products – Australian Pesticides and Veterinary Medicines Authority
 Electrical goods – Australian Electrical Equipment Safety Regulators
 Gas and appliance – Gas Technical Regulators Committee Australia New Zealand

The ACCC, in conjunction with state and territory offices of fair trading, is responsible for developing and enforcing mandatory consumer product safety standards except where the product falls into the jurisdiction of one of the specialist regulators mentioned above

News Media Bargaining Code

See also
Economy of Australia
 Australian Consumers' Association
 List of Australian Commonwealth Government entities
Two-price advertising (in Australia)

General:
Competition law
Competition policy
Competition regulator
Consumer protection

References

External links
Official ACCC website
Official AER website
Product Safety Australia website (maintained by ACCC)
Recalls website (maintained by ACCC)

Government agencies established in 1995
Competition
Commonwealth Government agencies of Australia
Competition regulators
Consumer rights agencies
Regulatory authorities of Australia
1995 establishments in Australia